Football Club de Mulhouse (commonly referred to as FCM or simply Mulhouse) is a French association football club based in Mulhouse. The club was founded in 1893 and currently play in the Championnat National 3, the fifth level of French football. Mulhouse plays its home matches at the Stade de l'Ill located within the city.

Mulhouse was founded under the name Fussball-Club Mülhausen in what was then Mülhausen, Alsace-Lorraine in Germany. The club's location has been dependent on the control of the Alsace region between France and Germany. Mulhouse has played in French football since the re-acquisition of the region after World War II and is the second-oldest football club in France after Le Havre AC. The club has achieved minimal honours in its history having spent most of its existence playing in the amateur divisions of France. However, Mulhouse have spent seven seasons in Ligue 1 and 27 seasons in Ligue 2. The club's highest honour to date in France was winning the Division d'Honneur in 1928. Regionally, Mulhouse has won the Alsace Division d'Honneur seven times. During the club's stint in Germany, it won the Gauliga Elsaß three times.

Mulhouse has served as a springboard for several football players and managers, most notably Arsène Wenger and Raymond Domenech. In the managerial role Wenger is known for his time at English club Arsenal, but prior to that had successful stints at Nancy, AS Monaco, and Nagoya Grampus. Domenech also played for Mulhouse, and he had his first managerial spell there. He later went on to manage the France national team from 2004 to 2010.

History 
Football Club de Mulhouse was founded in 1893 under the name Fussball Club Mülhausen by two young Englishmen enrolled at the Mulhouse Chemistry School in Mülhausen, Alsace-Lorraine, in Germany. The students introduced the sport to their fellow students, and a club was subsequently formed. In 1901, they were joined by a group of footballers known as the "Young Boys" from the Oberrealschule Gymnasium. The club was a member of the VSFV (German: Verband Süddeutscher Fussball Vereine or Federation of South German Football Clubs) by 1904; it suffered a financial crisis in 1905–06, but survived.

France reclaimed the territory of Alsace from Germany after World War I, and FC Mülhausen became part of the regional top flight Division d'Honneur – Alsace as FC Mulhouse (FCM) where the club captured the division title in 1921 and finished as vice-champions in 1926. FCM then put together a string of five consecutive division titles from 1928 to 1932. The 1932 regional title was parlayed into a win in the Coupe Sochaux, also known as the Challenge Peugeot, one of the predecessors of the national championship competition first staged the following season.

After the re-organization of French football into a national system, FCM played a single season in the First Division/Group A before being relegated. They played their way back to the top flight in 1934 until again being relegated in 1937.

With the onset of World War II and the re-conquest of Alsace by Germany, FCM returned to that country's football competition in the regional first division Gauliga Elsaß in 1941. They quickly became the dominant side there capturing titles in 1941, 1943, and 1944, but were not able to follow up with any success in the German national championship playoff rounds, being eliminated in the early going on each occasion. Play in the Gauliga was suspended part-way through the 1944–45 season as Allied armies advanced into Germany.

Following the war, FCM was once again returned to French football to play a single season in the second division before slipping to amateur level play, where they would remain until 1970. The club struggled through six seasons in the second division over the course of the decade. However, its performance improved in the 1980s, and FCM became a solid second division side, earning single-season turns in the top flight in 1982–83 and 1989–90. Through the early 1990s the club played as FC Mulhouse Sud-Alsace and continued to play second-tier football until relegated in 1998. A financial crisis followed and the club was bankrupted in 1999; it re-organised as an amateur side the following season. In 2005 the club was promoted from the CFA 2 (V) to the third division CFA (Championnat de France), the country's highest class.

In January 2017, the club was bought by American businessman Gary Allen, who saved the club from an immediate threat of bankruptcy by investing 150,000 euros. Ambitious goals to were set, to see the club rise to Ligue 2 in the medium term.

In 2020, the club was administratively relegated from Championnat National 2 due to financial issues, despite finishing 12th in its group. On 12 July 2022, the Grand Est league announced that Mulhouse were to be relegated to Régional 1 for financial reasons, subject to appeal.  Four days later, Gary Allen resigned as president of the club, quoting personal reasons. On 21 July 2022, the club was placed into receivership by the courts in Mulhouse, with debts reported to amount to 500,000 euros.

Stadium
Since 1979, FC Mulhouse has played its home games at the Stade de l'Ill. Between 1906 and the end of World War I the team played in the Stade Vélodrome and, after the war, in the Stade de Bourtzwiller.

Current squad

Notable players 

Had international caps for their respective countries. Players whose name is listed in bold represented their countries while playing for Mulhouse.

Coaches

References
Grüne, Hardy (2001). Vereinslexikon. Kassel: AGON Sportverlag 
 Historical French domestic league results Jérôme Faugera's football page 
 Historical German domestic league results Das Deutsche Fussball-Archiv

External links 
  

 
Association football clubs established in 1893
Football clubs from former German territories
1893 establishments in France
Football clubs in Grand Est
Sport in Mulhouse
Ligue 1 clubs